Marshall Joseph Cropper (born April 1, 1944) is a former American football player who played for Pittsburgh Steelers of the National Football League (NFL). He played college football at the University of Maryland Eastern Shore.

References

1944 births
Living people
Maryland Eastern Shore Hawks football players
Pittsburgh Steelers players
American football wide receivers